Delyan Point (‘Nos Delyan’ \'nos de-'lyan\) is a point on the northwest coast of Smith Island, South Shetland Islands forming the northeast side of the entrance to Vedena Cove.  Situated 4 km west-southwest of Cape Smith, 10.66 km northeast of Markeli Point, 8.9 km east-northeast of Gregory Point, and 1.4 km northwest of Matochina Peak.  Bulgarian early mapping in 2009.  Named after Peter Delyan – Czar Peter II of Bulgaria, 1040-1041 AD.

Maps
Chart of South Shetland including Coronation Island, &c. from the exploration of the sloop Dove in the years 1821 and 1822 by George Powell Commander of the same. Scale ca. 1:200000. London: Laurie, 1822.
  L.L. Ivanov. Antarctica: Livingston Island and Greenwich, Robert, Snow and Smith Islands. Scale 1:120000 topographic map. Troyan: Manfred Wörner Foundation, 2010.  (First edition 2009. )
 South Shetland Islands: Smith and Low Islands. Scale 1:150000 topographic map No. 13677. British Antarctic Survey, 2009.
 Antarctic Digital Database (ADD). Scale 1:250000 topographic map of Antarctica. Scientific Committee on Antarctic Research (SCAR). Since 1993, regularly upgraded and updated.
 L.L. Ivanov. Antarctica: Livingston Island and Smith Island. Scale 1:100000 topographic map. Manfred Wörner Foundation, 2017.

References
 Delyan Point. SCAR Composite Antarctic Gazetteer
 Bulgarian Antarctic Gazetteer. Antarctic Place-names Commission. (details in Bulgarian, basic data in English)

External links
 Delyan Point. Adjusted Copernix satellite image

Headlands of Smith Island (South Shetland Islands)
Bulgaria and the Antarctic